Abdur Rashid Khan may refer to:
 Abdur Rashid Khan (politician)
 Abdur Rashid Khan (poet)